Dendrobium falcorostrum, commonly known as the beech orchid, is a species of epiphytic orchid endemic to eastern Australia. It has spindle-shaped pseudobulbs, each with between two and five leathery leaves and up to twenty crowded white flowers with purple markings on the labellum.

Description
The side lobes curve upwards and the middle lobe has a Y-shaped ridge with a pointed end along its midline. Flowering occurs between August and October.

Taxonomy and naming
Dendrobium falcorostrum was first formally described in 1876 by Robert D. FitzGerald and the description was published in The Sydney Morning Herald.

Distribution and habitat
The beech orchid grows in highland rainforest, mainly on antarctic beech (Nothofagus moorei) between the Lamington National Park in Queensland and the Hunter River in New South Wales.

References 

falcorostrum
Endemic orchids of Australia
Orchids of New South Wales
Orchids of Queensland
Plants described in 1876